Adam Zavacký (born 27 June 1988) is a Slovak sprinter. He competed in the 100 metres event at the 2013 World Championships in Athletics.

References

1988 births
Living people
Slovak male sprinters
World Athletics Championships athletes for Slovakia
European Games silver medalists for Slovakia
Athletes (track and field) at the 2015 European Games
European Games medalists in athletics